Wankarani (Aymara wankara a kind of drum, -ni a suffix to indicate ownership, "the one with a wankara", Hispanicized spelling Huancarani) is a mountain in the Andes of Bolivia, about  high. It lies in the Oruro Department, Sajama Province, in the north of the Turco Municipality. Wankarani is situated south-west of the Kimsa Chata group, north-east of the mountain Yaritani and south-east of the mountains Ch'iyar Jaqhi and Surani.

References 

Mountains of Oruro Department